The Church of Santa María (Spanish: Iglesia de Santa María) is a church located in Salvatierra, Spain. It was declared Bien de Interés Cultural in 1984.

References 

Churches in Álava
Bien de Interés Cultural landmarks in Álava